Carmen Lynch (born January 17, 1972) is a Spanish-American comedian, actress, and writer based in New York City.

Her mother is from Spain, and her father is an American.  She has performed in English and Spanish in the United States and Spain.

She has appeared on The Tonight Show Starring Jimmy Fallon, Conan, Inside Amy Schumer, Last Comic Standing, The Late Show with David Letterman, The Late Show with Stephen Colbert, @midnight and A Prairie Home Companion.

Lynch participated in NBC's Last Comic Standing twice, both times making it to the final rounds. She was also a finalist in the Laughing Skull Comedy Festival.

She has also appeared in television shows including The Good Wife, and films such as Amira & Sam (2014), Carmen (2017) and Wanda Sykes Presents Herlarious (2013).

She is a co-creator of the video web series, Apt C3, with comedian Liz Miele and photographer Chris Vongsawat.

Lynch has done military appearances for American troops in Iraq and Kuwait. In 2017, her comedy routine and album, Dance Like You Don’t Need the Money, was named by The New York Times as “one of five to stream” and was voted the #1 comedy album of the year by SiriusXM.

References

External links

Living people
21st-century American comedians
American actresses
American writers
People from Maine
21st-century American women
1972 births